Donald McKay (January 13, 1836 – January 2, 1895) was a merchant and political figure in Prince Edward Island. He represented 2nd Queens in the Legislative Assembly of Prince Edward Island from 1876 to 1886 and 1890 to 1893 as a Conservative member.

He was born in New London, Prince Edward Island, the son of Donald McKay, a Scottish immigrant. McKay married Jane Matheson. He was a justice of the peace, a commissioner for Small Debt Court and a member of the board of Railway Commissioners.

He was defeated when he ran for reelection in 1886 and 1893. McKay died in Oyster Bed Bridge at the age of 58.

References 
The Canadian parliamentary companion, 1891, JA Gemmill

1836 births
1895 deaths
People from Queens County, Prince Edward Island
Progressive Conservative Party of Prince Edward Island MLAs